Gustavs is a Latvian masculine given name and may refer to:
Gustavs "Gustavo" Butelis (born 1978), Latvian rapper and record producer
Gustavs Celmiņš (1899-1968), a Latvian politician
Gustavs Ērenpreis (1891–1956), Latvian bicycle manufactuer
Gustav Klutsis (1895-1938), Latvian photographer 
Gustavs Šķilters (1874–1954), Latvian sculptor
Gustavs Tūrs (1890–1973), Latvian prelate of the Evangelical Lutheran Church of Latvia and Archbishop of Riga
Gustavs Vanags (1891—1965), Latvian organic chemist
Gustavs Zemgals (1871–1939), Latvian politician and the second President of Latvia

Latvian masculine given names